Cherokee Ranch, in Douglas County, Colorado near Sedalia, Colorado, has been a purebred cattle ranch since 1954, including raising Santa Gertrudis cattle.  The ranch is private property but offers frequent public and private events and tours.

A large portion of the ranch was listed on the National Register of Historic Places in 1994. The buildings are distributed among four historic building groups created by two homesteaders and a rich heiress. The four groups are:
Ranch Headquarters, originally the John Blunt Homestead and later known as Amnicola
Cherokee Castle
the Flower Homestead (Chickamauga), and
the Johnson ranch buildings.

The first part of the property eventually assembled was  homesteaded by Maine-born John E. Blunt.  A former Union soldier, he arrived with his family in 1868 from Kansas in a covered wagon which brought apple tree slips.  He settled on land along East Plum Creek at homestead site now on the south side of U.S. Highway 85.  It was extremely cold in winters along the creek, so they moved to higher ground in 1873 and built a wood-frame house at the current location of ranch headquarters.  An original apple tree brought to the new site survived in 1994.  Blunt acquired others' homestead properties and eventually what he called Sunflower Ranch had  on which he farmed wheat, sorghum, and steers. The ranch was sold by Ray Blunt in 1954 to Mildred Montague Genevieve Kimball, known as "Tweet" Kimball, who chose to call it Amnicola after her property in Chattanooga on the Tennessee River.

Tweet Kimball, known as "a delightfully eccentric international traveler, philanthropist, equestrian, award-winning cattlewoman and legendary hostess", lived 55 years in Cherokee Castle.

Her first of four husbands was Merritt Kirk Ruddock, of aristocratic family and C.I.A. connections.

The ranch has  on both south and north of U.S. Highway 85, but the listing is limited to the property north of 85, which includes four historic building groups. The four are:
Cherokee Castle, originally known as Charlford Castle, which is a 20th-century copy of a 15th-century Scottish castle.  It is the main residence of the ranch and was built during 1926–28.  It was designed by Denver architect  Burnham F. Hoyt, who is known for his later design of the Red Rocks Park Amphitheater.

the Flower Homestead (Chickamauga), began with English-born Frederick Gerald Flower ploughing  of land and stringing barbed wire and then, in 1894, filing a homestead claim. He built a stone house on the edge of a high plateau with views of the Front Range, and his wife and sister moved in in 1895. His remote property was accessed by a track which later became Daniels Park Road.

the Johnson ranch buildings. The Wauhatchie Barn, an element of the Johnson Dairy Farm, has recently been restored.

The listing covers property north of U.S. Route 85 and south of Daniels Park Road.

References

External links
Cherokee Ranch, official website

Castles in Colorado
Ranches in Colorado
National Register of Historic Places in Douglas County, Colorado

Buildings and structures completed in 1868